Spoiled is a television and stage play by Simon Gray, first broadcast by the BBC in 1968 as part of The Wednesday Play series and later adapted for the stage. It is set over a single weekend in the house of a schoolmaster, Howarth, who invites one of his O-Level French students to his home to do some last-minute cramming before an exam. Howarth has an almost unnatural enthusiasm, while his student, Donald, is painfully shy. Meanwhile, Howarth's pregnant wife is far from happy about having someone to stay in the midst of her fears about parenting.

Characters
Howarth
Donald
Joanna
Les
Mrs Clenham

Television production
Spoiled was originally a play written for the BBC's The Wednesday Play series, broadcast first on 28 August 1968, and again on 9 July 1969. It was directed by Waris Hussein and produced by Graeme MacDonald. Believed to be lost, it had the following cast:

Howarth- Michael Craig
Donald - Elizabeth Shepherd
Joanna - Simon Ward
Les - Mark Rose
Mr Wyecroft - Will Leighton
Mrs Clenham - Carmel McSharry

Stage 
Spoiled was adapted by the author for the stage and first performed at the Close Theatre Club, Glasgow, in 1970, directed by Stephen Hollis. It had the following cast:

Howarth- Daniel Massey
Donald - David Hayman
Joanna - Stephanie Bidmead
Les - Philip Sayer
Mrs Clenham - Pamela Pitchford

The play was then performed at the Haymarket Theatre, London, also directed by Stephen Hollis, from 24 February 1971. It had the following cast:

Howarth- Jeremy Kemp
Donald - Simon Ward
Joanna - Anna Massey
Les - Peter Denyer
Mrs Clenham - Pamela Pitchford

Australian TV version

The film was adapted for Australian TV in 1974.

References

Sources
Gray, Simon. Simon Gray: Plays 1. London, Faber and Faber, 2010.

Simon Gray website

1968 television plays
1971 plays
1974 films
BBC television dramas
Lost BBC episodes
West End plays
1970s English-language films